Huzhou railway station is a railway station in Wuxing District, Huzhou, Zhejiang, China. It offers both conventional and high-speed service.

The future Shanghai–Suzhou–Huzhou high-speed railway will serve this station.

History 
On 28 June 2020, the Shangqiu–Hefei–Hangzhou high-speed railway opened, offering direct connections to Wuhu and Hefei.

References 

Railway stations in Zhejiang